Roberto Calcaterra (born 6 February 1972 in Civitavecchia) is a retired water polo defense player from Italy, who represented his native country at the 1996 Summer Olympics in Atlanta, Georgia. There he won the bronze medal with the men's national team. Calcaterra also competed at the 2004 Summer Olympics in Athens, Greece.

See also
 List of Olympic medalists in water polo (men)
 List of world champions in men's water polo
 List of World Aquatics Championships medalists in water polo

References
 RAI Profile

External links
 

1972 births
Living people
People from Civitavecchia
Italian male water polo players
Water polo players at the 1996 Summer Olympics
Water polo players at the 2004 Summer Olympics
Olympic water polo players of Italy
Olympic bronze medalists for Italy
Olympic medalists in water polo
World Aquatics Championships medalists in water polo
Medalists at the 1996 Summer Olympics
Sportspeople from the Metropolitan City of Rome Capital